Fiebig is a German surname. Notable people with the surname include:

Anett Fiebig (born 1961), German swimmer
Frédéric Fiebig (1885–1953), Latvian-born French painter
Frederick Fiebig, 19th-century German photographer
Heinz Fiebig (1897–1964), German general
Kurt Fiebig (1908–1988), German composer
Martin Fiebig (1891–1947), German general
Taryn Fiebig (1972–2021), Australian opera soprano

See also

German-language surnames
German toponymic surnames